Azhagarsamy is a 1999 Tamil language drama film directed by Sundar C. The film stars Sathyaraj and Roja. It was released on 10 December 1999.

Plot

A rich landlord gave money to Thayama, a pregnant woman, to save her husband and she later swore to give her baby in return. Her husband died and she gave her baby.

Azhagarsamy was brought-up by the landlord and the landlord decides to marry Azhagarsamy to his daughter Suja, an arrogant city girl. Thayama begins to work in Azhagarsamy's house.

Later, Azhagarsamy marries Suja who hates and insults him every time. Vinu Chakravarthy who wants to grab Suja's property tries to give milk with poison to Suja who is pregnant. Thayamma who realises the problem sacrifices her life by drinking the milk and Azhagarsamy learns that Thayamma was his mother. In the end, Suja unites with Azhagarsamy.

Cast

Sathyaraj as Azhagu (Azhagarsamy)
Roja as Suja
Radha Ravi as Landlord
Sujatha as Thayama
Goundamani
Senthil
Vinu Chakravarthy
Ponnambalam
Madhan Bob
Ra. Sankaran
Halwa Vasu
Singamuthu
Periya Karuppu Thevar
LIC Narasimhan
Alphonsa (special appearance)

Soundtrack

The film score and the soundtrack were composed by Deva. The soundtrack, released in 1999, features 7 tracks with lyrics written by Pazhani Bharathi.

Reception
New Straits Times wrote "If you fancy a family-oriented, old-fashioned story, with a touch of humour, then go for this one".

References

1999 films
Indian drama films
1990s Tamil-language films
Films scored by Deva (composer)
Films directed by Sundar C.
1999 drama films